The Kargaly is a river of the Aktobe Region, Kazakhstan. It flows into the Ilek, a tributary of the Ural River near the city of Aktobe.

References 

Rivers of Kazakhstan
Geography of Aktobe Region
Ural basin